Bodensee-Literaturpreis (Lake Constance Literature Prize) is a literary prize awarded in Baden-Württemberg, Germany. The city of Überlingen has been awarding the Lake Constance Literature Prize since 1954. The foundation of this municipal literature prize goes back to an initiative of the Baltic writer Eugen Assmann (1902–1979). The prize is to be awarded to an author for a special literary achievement within the literature of the entire Lake Constance area. The prize is endowed with 5,000 euros.

Winners 

1954 Wolfram von den Steinen for Notker der Dichter und seine geistige Welt
1955 Friedrich Georg Jünger for "sein lyrisches Werk"
1956 Leopold Ziegler for "sein philosophisches Werk"
1957 Richard Beitl for "sein volkskundliches und erzählerisches Werk"
1958 Mary Lavater-Sloman forEinsamkeit
1959 Wilhelm Boeck forJoseph Anton Feuchtmayer
1960 Johannes Duft for Bibliotheca Sangallensis
1961 Albert Knoepfli for "sein kunsthistorisches Schaffen"
1962 Felix Freiherr von Hornstein for Wald und Mensch
1963 not awarded
1964 Jacob Picard for Die alte Lehre
1965 Otto Feger for Geschichte des Bodenseeraumes
1966 Albert Bächtold for "sein erzählerisches Werk"
1967 Martin Walser for "sein Gesamtwerk"
1968 Georg Siemens for "seine erzählenden und wissenschaftlichen Arbeiten"
1969 Gebhard Spahr for Weingartner Liederhandschrift
1970 not awarded
1971 Claus Zoege for Die Bildhauerfamilie Zürn
1972 Werner Koch for Seeleben
1973 not awarded
1974 Ernst Benz for Geist und Landschaft
1975 Horst Stern for "seine publizistische Tätigkeit, besonders im Hinblick auf die Ökologie des Bodenseeraumes"
1976 und 1977 exposed
1978 Manfred Bosch for "seine Gedichte in Radolfzeller Mundart und seine Essays"
1979 Arno Borst for Mönche am Bodensee 610–1525
1980 Otto Frei for "sein erzählerisches Werk"
1981 Hermann Kinder for "seine epische Prosa" und Peter Renz for Vorläufige Beruhigung
1983 Ingrid Puganigg for Fasnacht
1985 Werner Dürrson for Das Kattenhorner Schweigen
1987 Golo Mann for "seine dem Bodensee geltenden essayistischen und autobiographischen Schriften"
1989 Hans Boesch for Der Sog
1991 Bruno Epple for "sein literarisches Schaffen"
1993 Pirmin Meier for Paracelsus – Arzt und Prophet'
1995 not awarded
1997 Manfred Bosch for Bohème am Bodensee1999 Beat Brechbühl for Fussreise mit Adolf Dietrich and for "seine Beiträge zu Auf dem Rücken des Sees"
2001 Werner Mezger for Das große Buch der schwäbisch-alemannischen Fasnet2004 Zsuzsanna Gahse for durch und durch. Müllheim/Thur in drei Kapiteln2006 Markus Werner for Am Hang2008 Michael Köhlmeier for Abendland''
2010 Christian Uetz for previous literary oeuvre 
2012 Peter Stamm for previous literary
2014 Arnold Stadler for previous literary oeuvre
2016 Peter Salomon for previous literary oeuvre
2018 Eva Gesine Baur for previous literary oeuvre
2020 Monika Helfer for literary oeuvre

References

Literary awards of Baden-Württemberg
Awards established in 1954